KOAB may refer to:

 KOAB-FM, a radio station (91.3 FM) licensed to Bend, Oregon, United States
 KOAB-TV, a television station (channel 3 analog/11 digital) licensed to Bend, Oregon, United States